RailTel Corporation of India Ltd. is an Indian public sector enterprise which provides broadband and VPN services. RailTel was formed in September 2000 with the objective of creating a nationwide broadband, telecom and multimedia network, and to modernise train control operation and safety system of Indian Railways. RailTel's network passes through around 5,000 stations across the country, covering all major commercial centres.

History
The Indian Railways (IR) was initially solely dependent on the Department of Telecom (now BSNL) for their control and administrative communication circuits. To increase circuit efficiency, the Railways began building up its own communication systems from early 1970s based on overhead telephone lines, quad cables and microwave signalling. In 1983, the Railway Reforms Committee decided to introduce optical fibre cable (OFC) based communications in IR to provide safety, reliability, availability and serviceability through use of a dedicated network. The decision was also taken to create a network independent of the DoT and replace the existing microwave telecom systems (60% of which had reached end of life) with OFC.

Indian Railways commissioned the first OFC on the Churchgate–Virar line in Mumbai in 1988 for train operation and control purpose, which consisted of 60 km of network across 28 stations. The network was expanded in Central India with the commissioning of 900 km of OFC network in 1991–92 across Durg–Nagpur, Nagpur–Itarsi and Itarsi–Bhusaval sections of the Howrah–Nagpur–Mumbai line, and in Eastern India with the commissioning of 60 km of OFC network in Tatanagar–Chakradhrapur section of the same line.

The second National Telecom Policy in 1999 opened the National Long-Distance segment under favourable licensing conditions with revenue sharing to assist mobile network operators to spread their networks across India. In 2000, the Government announced the formation of a telecom corporation to build a nationwide broadband multimedia telecommunication network. RailTel was established on 26 September 2000 as a Public Sector Undertaking (PSU), wholly owned by the Indian Railways.

Projects

WiFi and WiMax
RailTel, formerly in collaboration with Google, provides free WiFi Internet access at selected railway stations across India. Google chose railway stations as the location to provide free WiFi because stations have access to a reliable power supply and fibre provided by RailTel, and because the passengers at a station come from all demographics of India.

The free WiFi service was launched at Mumbai Central railway station in January 2016. In April 2016, the service was expanded to nine more railway stations. In June 2016, Google announced that free WiFi was available at 19 stations in India and was being used by over 1.5 million people.

In September 2016, Google announced a public WiFi initiative called Google Station. The company planned to expand free WiFi coverage under the initiative to locations such as cafes and malls across India, and later expand worldwide.

In June 2018, Google announced that its Free WiFi project was now running at 400 Indian railway stations. As a result, there were more than 8 million people accessing the internet each month via the project.

The partnership between Google and Railwire ended in May 2020. Now Railwire alone provides free WiFi for 30mins at low speed and further paid plans at 34Mbps to more than 5000 railway stations in India.

Railwire
Based on its nationwide fibre network, RailTel offers RailWire, a joint venture with managed service providers to provide voice, video and multimedia access on a single connection at a customer's home or office.

Awards
RailTel received the 12th National Awards for Excellence in Cost Management 2014.

References

E-government in India
Railway companies of India
Government-owned companies of India
Companies based in Gurgaon
Technology in society
Telecommunications companies of India
Indian companies established in 2000
2000 establishments in Haryana
Companies listed on the National Stock Exchange of India
Companies listed on the Bombay Stock Exchange
Government-owned telecommunications companies